This is a list of members of the eighth Australian Capital Territory Legislative Assembly, as elected at and subsequent to the October 2012 election.

See also
2012 Australian Capital Territory general election

Notes
 Brindabella Liberal MLA Zed Seselja resigned on 11 June 2013 to contest a Senate seat at the 2013 federal election. Nicole Lawder was elected to the casual vacancy in a countback on 24 June.
 Molonglo Labor MLA Katy Gallagher resigned on 23 December 2014 after announcing her intention to contest Labor preselection for a Senate vacancy. Meegan Fitzharris was elected to the casual vacancy in a countback on 15 January 2015.
 Ginninderra Labor MLA Mary Porter resigned on 19 February 2016 for health reasons. Jayson Hinder was elected to the casual vacancy in a countback on 3 March 2016.
 Brindabella Liberal MLA Brendan Smyth resigned on 15 July 2016 to take up the role of Commissioner for International Engagement for the ACT. Val Jeffery was elected to the casual vacancy in a countback on 28 July 2016.

References

Members of Australian Capital Territory parliaments by term
21st-century Australian politicians